The Dongfeng-41 (DF-41, CSS-20) is a fourth-generation Chinese solid-fuelled road-mobile intercontinental ballistic missile operated by the People's Liberation Army Rocket Force (formerly the Second Artillery Corps). DF-41 is the fourth and the latest generation of the Dongfeng series strategic missiles developed by China.  The missile was officially unveiled at the China National Day military parade on 1 October 2019.

Design
It is believed to have a top speed of Mach 25, and to be capable of MIRV delivery (up to 10). The development of the MIRV technology is reported to be in response to the deployment of the United States national missile defense system which degrades China's nuclear deterrence capability. The project started in 1986, and may now be coupled with the JL-2 program.

Though there have been reports that the DF-41 can carry 6 to 10 warheads, analysts think it most likely carries only three warheads, with the additional payload used for many penetration aids.

Richard Fisher, an expert on Asia-Pacific military affairs, says that a typical PLA Rocket Force unit has 6-12 missile launchers and may have an additional 6-12 "reload missiles", i.e. missiles to be launched after the first missile with which the launcher is equipped are launched, indicating 12-24 DF-41 missiles per unit.  If a missile had 10 warheads, that would give a single PLARF unit the capability to target the contiguous United States with 120-240 nuclear warheads.

Development
Air Power Australia reported that the DF-41 was cancelled pre-2000, with the technology developed transferred to the DF-31A. It was incorrectly anticipated that the DF-41 would be delivered to the Second Artillery around the year 2010. Some military experts had expected that it could be unveiled at the 2009 National Parade. However, rehearsals of the military parade did not feature this missile.

The American conservative website The Washington Free Beacon reported in August 2012 that the DF-41 had its first flight test on July 24, 2012. 

In April 2013, Taiwan's National Security Bureau head reported to the Legislative Yuan that the DF-41 was still in development, and not yet deployed.

The U.S. Department of Defense in its 2013 report to Congress on China's military developments made no explicit mention of the DF-41, but did state that "China may also be developing a new road-mobile ICBM, possibly capable of carrying a multiple independently targetable re-entry vehicle (MIRV)", which may refer to the DF-41. Later in 2013 The Washington Free Beacon reported that the second launch test took place on December 13, 2013 from the Wuzhai missile launch center in Shanxi province to an impact range in western China, according to officials familiar with details of the tests.

The Free Beacon reported in June 2014 that U.S. officials had said by then that the DF-41 was test launched twice since 2012.

In August 2014, China Shaanxi Provincial Environmental Monitoring Center website accidentally made a news report about events of setting environmental monitoring site for DF-41 ICBM; the news report (and the whole website) was taken down shortly after getting public attention.

The Free Beacon claimed that China had test-launched a DF-41 using multiple reentry vehicles for the first time on 13 December 2014. Later that month, China confirmed that the launch occurred, saying it has a legitimate right to conduct scientific tests within its border, that they were not targeting any country, and the development of the missile did not affect China's policy of not using nuclear weapons first in a conflict.  The launch took place at the Wuzhai Missile and Space Test Center in central China and impacted in the west of the country.

In August 2015, the missile was flight-tested for the fourth time. In December 2015, the missile was flight-tested for the fifth time. The flight test demonstrated the use of two multiple independently targetable reentry vehicles. The missile launch and dummy warheads were tracked by satellites to an impact range in western China.

In April 2016, China successfully conducted the 7th test of DF-41 with two dummy warheads near the South China Sea, amid growing tensions between Washington and Beijing about the area.

On January 23, 2017, China was reported to have deployed a strategic ballistic missile brigade to Heilongjiang province, bordering Russia, along with another strategic ballistic missile brigade deploying to Xinjiang.

In November 2017, just two days before U.S. President Trump's visit to China, the DF-41 was tested in the Gobi desert.

On October 1, 2019, China on its 70th anniversary displayed the missiles in a large military parade.

Rail-mobile versions
On 5 December 2015, China conducted a launcher test of a new rail-mobile version of the DF-41, similar to the Russian RT-23 Molodets.

Silo-based versions
In 2021, the Federation of American Scientists (FAS) said China was building 120 missile silos for DF-41 near Yumen in Gansu and another 110 missile silos near Hami in Xinjiang.

A third site was discovered to be under construction near Ordos in Inner Mongolia in August, 2021. The new site will hold more than 100 ICBM.

Together, the three new missile bases will house 350 to 400 new long-range nuclear missiles, U.S. officials said.

References

External links
CSIS Missile Threat - Dong Feng 41

Intercontinental ballistic missiles of the People's Republic of China
Military equipment introduced in the 2010s